Teofil Oroian (born September 20, 1947) is a Romanian Army officer and military historian.

Biography

He was born in Chimitelnic (today Cipăieni), in Mureș County. He graduated from the Ştefan cel Mare Military High-School in  Câmpulung Moldovenesc in 1966 and from the Nicolae Bălcescu Military School of Active Officers in Sibiu as military engineer in 1969. In 1981 he graduated with degrees in History and Philosophy from the University of Bucharest. In November 1996, he earned a Ph.D. degree in military science on military history.

Oroian was an associate and assistant professor at the NCO Military Engineering School between 1977 and 1981 and at the Carol I National Defence University between 1981 and 1994. Between 1994 and 2002 he was first officer, bureau chief and chief adjunct of Military Archivistic Service (today Military Service for Archives and Documentation). Since February 28, 2002 he is colonel in reserve.

He has published numerous studies and articles in history and military science journals. He has also authored several books and co-authored a short movie scenario.

Works

 PhD thesis, Acţiuni militare desfăşurate de trupele române în Kuban şi Crimeea, 1943–1944, 1996
 Şefii Marelui Statului Major Român (1941–1945). Destine la răscruce, Editura Militară, Bucharest, 1995
 Petre Otu, Teofil Oroian, and Emil Ion, Personalităţi ale gândirii militare româneşti, vol. I-II, Editura Academiei de Înalte Studii Militare, Bucharest, 1997–2001.  
 Tentaţia libertăţii. Operaţiunea "Sumava" (1968) – un simplu pretext, Editura Militară, Bucharest, 1999
 Hitler – Antonescu. Caucazul şi Crimeea, Editura Paideia, Bucharest, 1999
 Colonel Petre Brătilă, Teofil Oroian, Dumitru Dobre, Personalităţi ale medicinei militare româneşti, Editura Romcartexim, Bucharest, 1999. 
 Golgota Estului (iulie 1942 – martie 1944), Editura Fundaţiei Culturale Române, Bucharest, 2000
 Teofil Oroian and Gheorghe Nicolescu, Şefii Statului Major General Român (1859–2000), Editura Europa Nova, Bucharest, 2001.  
 Comandanţi ai Corpului 7 Armată, Editura Modelism, Dej, 2001
 co-authored the scenario of the short movie Memoria Oştirii. Arhivele Militare Române, Studioul Cinematografic al Armatei, 2001

References
Dosarele Istoriei, 12(88)/2003, p. 23 

Romanian military historians
Academic staff of Carol I National Defence University
Romanian Land Forces officers
People from Mureș County
University of Bucharest alumni
Living people
1947 births